Tipula fascipennis is a species of true craneflies.

Distribution
Widespread throughout the Palaearctic.

References

 

Tipulidae
Diptera of Europe
Diptera of Asia
Insects described in 1804